After Dark is a British late-night live television discussion programme that broadcast weekly on Channel 4 between 1987 and 1991, and which returned for specials between 1993 and 1997; it was later revived by the BBC for a single season broadcast on BBC Four in 2003.

Roly Keating of the BBC described it as "one of the great television talk formats of all time". In 2010 the television trade magazine Broadcast wrote "After Dark defined the first 10 years of Channel 4, just as Big Brother did for the second" and in 2018 the programme was cited in an editorial in The Times as an example of high-quality television.
 
Broadcast live and with no scheduled end time, the series, inspired by an Austrian programme called Club 2, was considered to be a groundbreaking reinvention of the discussion programme format. The programme was hosted by a variety of presenters, and each episode had around half a dozen guests, often including a member of the public.

Programme synopsis
The programme featured a different topic each week, with guests selected to provoke lively discussion; subject matter included "the treatment of children, of the mentally ill, of prisoners, and about class, cash and racial and sexual difference", as well as "matters of exceptional sensitivity to the then Thatcher government, such as state secrecy or the Troubles in Northern Ireland"; "places further afield...– Chile, Eritrea, Iran, Iraq, Israel, Nicaragua, South Africa and Russia – featured regularly" and "less apparently solemn subjects – sport, fashion, gambling and pop music – were in the mix from the start".  

A television historian wrote in 2011 that the programme "was not concerned to allow the revelation of celebrities' private lives or the promotion of their products, they were expected to converse seriously. Oliver Reed appeared drunk, groped Kate Millett and was removed; in contrast Bianca Jagger appeared in intellectual debate with several high-ranking American officials over the Contras in Nicaragua".

Other memorable conversations included footballer Garth Crooks disputing the future of the game with politician Sir Rhodes Boyson and MP Teresa Gorman walking out of a discussion about unemployment with Billy Bragg. Other guests included "poets and pornographers, spies and solicitors, feminists and farmers, witches and whalers, judges and journalists". The Daily Telegraph said "the discussion was open-ended. It would stop when the guests decided the debate was over, not when TV executives said so". In 2014 an academic book summed up the series as: "After Dark created an unprecedented climate which encouraged spaces where the process of thinking could be brought to light".

Specials and spin-offs
The show ended in 1991 but a number of one-off specials were broadcast from 1993 and 1997, with a subsequent reboot by the BBC in 2003. In 2004 After Dark was characterised as "legendary" by the Open University and in 2014 as "the most uncensorable programme in the history of British television". In 2016 The Herald wrote that "Unlike reality television live feeds today, After Dark was essential viewing, with some very serious talk enlivened even more by unexpected events." In 2017 the Journal of British Cinema and Television called it "an excitingly different and politically adventurous kind of programme" and in 2018 an academic history of independent television production in the UK judged it "as an 'experiment' that challenged the limitations of television as a medium of intensive and democratic deliberation and discussion it was very successful, and from the vantage of history still seems remarkably fresh to this day."

From 2010 to 2020 individual programmes were available for online streaming at BFI InView. In 2020 Simon Heffer wrote in The Daily Telegraph that "the time is surely ripe for the return of a programme such as After Dark" and The Guardian listed After Dark as one of the "jewels" in the history of television - "it offered a thing that's now extinct: constructive debate". In 2021 The Daily Telegraph wrote of the "curious brilliance" of the show: "It feels like the art of reasonable discussion has been lost in the modern world...increasingly sanitised and controlled since the freeform days of After Dark".

Start on Channel 4

The media academic David Lee described the founding of the programme in his history of independent television production in the UK:

Sir Jeremy Isaacs, the founding Chief Executive of Channel 4, wrote an account of the network's early years in his book Storm Over 4. In it he selects twenty-six programmes ('a very personal... choice'), including After Dark, which he describes as follows:

The programme allowed Isaacs to realise one of his longest-held ambitions. "When I first started in television at Granada... Sidney Bernstein said to me that the worst words ever uttered on TV were, I'm sorry, that's all we have time for. Especially since they were always uttered just as someone was about to say something really interesting." After Dark would only end when its guests had nothing more to say.

From late April in 1987, Channel 4 screened a Nighttime strand, a mixture of films and discussion programmes that ran until 3am on Thursdays, Fridays and Saturdays. Channel 4 launched After Dark as an open ended format broadcast on Friday nights (later Saturday nights) as an original piece of programming that would be inexpensive to produce. There was no 'chair', simply a 'host', and the discussion took place around a coffee table in a darkened studio. Due to its late-night scheduling the series was dubbed After Closing Time by the BBC1 comedy series Alas Smith and Jones.

The series was made by production company Open Media. The series editor, Sebastian Cody, talking about the programme in an interview in 2003, said that "Reality TV is artificial. After Dark is real in the sense that what you see is what you get, which isn't the case with something that's been edited to give the illusion of being real. Other shows wind people up with booze beforehand, then when they're actually on the programme they give them glasses of water. We give our guests nothing until they arrive on set and then they can drink orange juice, or have a bottle of wine. And we let them go to the loo."

Viewer response
In 1987, The Guardian wrote: "After Dark, the closest Britain gets to an unstructured talk show, is already finding that the more serious the chat, the smaller the audience... Channel 4's market research executive Sue Clench... says that around three million saw some of After Dark in its first slot."

The audience survey conducted later by Channel 4 reported that After Dark was watched by 13% of all adults, rising to what the research company referred to as a "staggering figure" of 28% amongst young men. One viewer is quoted in the academic study Talk on Television as follows:

The programme is still fondly remembered by viewers. For example, in 2016, Gail Walker, the editor of the Belfast Telegraph, recalled After Dark programmes about nuclear issues and in 2020 the Cardiff-based writer Joe Morgan wrote a tribute A Sword in the Darkness, saying the show "broke all existing rules and conventions. There has been nothing like it ever since". In 2022 the Liberal Democrat Jonathan Calder published Remembering After Dark, the best TV discussion programme ever.

Critical response

After Dark earned a remarkable spread of critical enthusiasm, from the Socialist Worker ("my favourite chat show") and The Guardian ("one of the most inspired and effective uses of airtime yet devised"), and The Daily Telegraph ("A shining example of late-night television"), to more media focussed journals such as the BFI's Sight & Sound ("often made The Late Show look like the Daily Mirror") and even the US showbiz bible Variety in its review of the year ("compulsive for late-night viewers"). The Listener magazine called it "The programme in which you can see the people think".

Guest response
Author James Rusbridger wrote in The Listener magazine: "When I appeared on a Channel 4 After Dark programme recently my postman, milkman and more than two dozen strangers stopped me in the street and said how much they'd enjoyed it and quoted verbatim extracts from the discussion."

In 2021 author David Hebditch wrote an article about appearing After Dark to discuss pornography. It is available here.

Journalist Peter Hillmore described appearing on After Dark as follows:

Notable guests and programmes

Series One

Peter Hain, Clive Ponting, Peter Utley, Colin Wallace and "Secrets"
The first ever After Dark programme (1 May 1987) was described in The Listener:

Nancy Banks-Smith wrote in The Guardian:

The programme finished with the Beatles singing "Do You Want to Know a Secret?" The programme is available online here.

Simon Hughes
The second programme of the first series – transmitted on 8 May 1987 – centred on press ethics and featured, among others, Tony Blackburn, Peter Tatchell, Victoria Gillick, Johnny Edgecombe and a Private Eye journalist. A week later After Dark broadcast the following correction in relation to the British Member of Parliament Simon Hughes: "Mr Hughes has asked us to say that he is not a homosexual, has never been a homosexual and has no intention of becoming a homosexual in the future." He has, however, since declared that he is bisexual.

"Do the British Love Their Children?"
As described by academic Nick Basannavar in 2021:

David Mellor, David Yallop and "The Mafia"
The Financial Times described the following week's discussion about the Mafia:

During the programme it was claimed that Pope John Paul I was "eliminated...because he discovered that mafia profits from heroin had been laundered using the Vatican Bank". "Spectacular corruption allegations from author David Yallop" were described by The Observer as follows:

Chris Horrie and Peter Chippendale detail what followed: "the story had caused horror among the country's journalists, who waited breathlessly for a shower of writs to descend on the programme makers.... But although hacks who missed the show swapped videos and endlessly replayed extracts for snippets of information, nothing happened to the programme makers." Some years later David Mellor and writer Gaia Servadio described how their friendship started on the programme.

Teresa Gorman and "Is Britain Working?"
On 12 June 1987, the night after the British General Election, "the first day of the third term of Thatcherism – a show called Is Britain Working? brought together victorious Tory MP Teresa Gorman; 'Red Wedge' pop singer Billy Bragg; Helen from the Stonehenge Convoy; old colonialist Colonel Hilary Hook... and Adrian, one of the jobless. It was a perfect example of the chemistry you can get. There were unlikely alliances (Bragg and Hook) and Mrs Gorman" "stormed off the set, claiming she had been misled about the nature of the programme" "She told the leftist pop singer Billy Bragg: 'You and your kind are finished. We are the future now.'" Bragg said "I sing in smokey rooms every night and I can keep talking for far longer than you can Teresa". Bragg explained later: "She was so smug. And because she was Essex I took it personally. Then she accused me of being a fine example of Thatcherism."

The Independent said:

"Killing With Care?"

The programme the following week was described by ITN as "A discussion on euthanasia, with the controversial Dutch doctor  who has performed euthanasia; British Socialist and Methodist preacher Lord Soper; the founder of the Cancer support charity 'Cancerbackup', Dr Vicky Clement-Jones (in an appearance from her death bed – she died shortly after the end of this programme), quadraplegic Maggie Davis, Catholic philosopher John Finnis, a gay man and the founder of a hospice."

Edward Teller and "Peace in Our Time"
The programme on 3 July 1987 "saw the father of the H-bomb Edward Teller concede that he lobbied for the worst of all weapons because of what the Russians had done to his country".

Jacques Vergès and "Klaus Barbie"

After Dark, "ending its ten-week trial run, has been a remarkable success" wrote The Independent in July 1987. "The series has brought to television the rare acts of listening, thinking and thorough and subtle discussion.... In the small hours of Saturday morning, Maitre Jacques Vergès, defence counsel to the Butcher of Lyons, leaned back on a sofa with a half-glass of something pale and put his case. A journalist and a canon and a Resistance fighter and a concentration camp survivor listened and put theirs." Vergès said "the reason people were still prosecuted for massacring Jews was because the Jews were white; if they had not been, the crimes would have been swept under the carpet long ago."

The Guardian described what happened:

The Sunday Times:

Jewish Telegraphic Agency:

Series Two

"Freemasonry: Beyond The Law?"
At the start of the second series The Independent reported ("Masons pull out of TV debate with policeman") that "Chief Inspector Brian Woollard, the Metropolitan Police officer at the centre of the Freemasonry controversy, will go on national television tonight to state his case." Woollard "completed 33 years in the force, earned seven commendations, and was responsible for tracking down the Angry Brigade." The Listener magazine described the programme:

Shere Hite and "Marriage"
Mark Lawson wrote in The Independent:

The Evening Standard described this as "totally compelling viewing":

William "Spider" Wilson

The Sunday Times said the programme on 4 March 1988 "certainly remains lodged in many minds. Spider... was 'discovered' by a programme researcher ferreting out characters at London's cardboard city. Spider duly came into the Channel 4 studios, cobweb tattooed on his forehead, to talk about drug addiction, being gay and living rough. (Host) Helena Kennedy recalls that homeless Spider, sitting on the plump sofas in the mock studio living room with fellow guests, did not take kindly to being lectured about fecklessness by John Heddle, a Tory MP". She described the confrontation:

Bernadette McAliskey and "Licensed to Kill?"
The Financial Times wrote of the programme on 18 March 1988:

Another guest, General Sir Anthony Farrer-Hockley suggested to Ms McAliskey that she owed her life to the skill of paratroop surgeons who cared for her after loyalist paramilitaries tried to kill her.

"Horse Racing"

The Racing Post described the programme broadcast on the evening after the 1988 Grand National:

Among the other guests was the Duchess of Argyll, appearing "so she said, to put the point of view of the horse", who later walked out of the programme "because she was so very sleepy".

"Bewitched, Bothered or Bewildered?"

On 30 April 1988 Tony Wilson hosted "a special Walpurgis Night edition...which featured representatives of several pagan, occult and Satanist groups. The general tone of the questioning was inquiring and non-judgmental, and the only hostility was expressed by the "token" Christian spokeswoman, ex-witch Audrey Harper. Before the mid-1980s, it would have appeared ludicrous to discuss British Satanists as a serious phenomenon, still less a social problem."

"Derry '68"
Socialist Worker wrote "A recent discussion on the Irish civil rights struggle in 1968 provided one of the best nights' viewing in ages. Eamonn McCann dominated the whole discussion, destroying anyone who dared to cross him." The television reviewer of the New Statesman wrote that "The After Dark discussion, "Derry 68: Look Back in Anger?", was simply the most enlightening programme on Northern Ireland I have ever seen." In 2021 this programme was shown again during the Docs Ireland international documentary festival run by the Belfast Film Festival.

"Israel: 40 Years On"
On 14 May 1988, The Daily Telegraph wrote:

"What is Sex For?"
A week later "during a discussion about sex, the programme introduced the physically unappealing Anthony Burgess to the equally charming (and equally sex obsessed) Andrea Dworkin, in the observant presence of a third writer, transgender rights activist Roz Kaveney".

"Winston Churchill"

The Socialist Worker described the 28 May 1988 edition of "my favourite chat show":

As the Radio Times wrote later: "The most explosive argument was between Lord Hailsham and veteran trade unionist Jack Jones. There was... 50 years of hate between them."

Harvey Proctor and "Open To Exposure?"

Milton Shulman in The Listener magazine wrote about the edition broadcast on 4 June 1988:

And the Evening Standard described "riveting television":

Proctor himself reported in his 2016 memoir that:

Harry Belafonte, Denis Worrall and "South Africa"
"After the Nelson Mandela concert last summer, (After Dark) ran a discussion programme including Harry Belafonte, Breyten Breytenbach, Denis Worrall and Ismail Ayob (Mandela's lawyer)." The Guardian described this as "the most civilised and stimulating of current TV programmes" (pictured here with a complete list of guests here) and later Victoria Brittain described the "extraordinary experience of debating with Worrall":

A year later it became public that there was "a revealing off-camera incident between Harry Belafonte and South Africa's ex-ambassador Denis Worrall. For the first three hours of the programme Worrall played Mr Nice Guy but in the closing 30 minutes the diplomatic layers peeled off. The noble Belafonte shook his head regretfully as Worrall's tone changed and he said he would pray for Worrall. Trying to regain lost ground after the programme, Worrall went up to Belafonte and, according to the production team, said: Well, Mr Belafonte, you're really quite intelligent, aren't you?"

Patricia Highsmith

Following the programme broadcast on 18 June 1988 The Guardian wrote:

The Today newspaper wrote:

Andrew Wilson, in his biography of Highsmith, expanded:

Bill Margold and "Pornography"
The Evening Standard reviewed the 25 June 1988 discussion:

The Guardian added:

The background to the programme is detailed in an article by one of the guests, author David Hebditch, available here. All editions of After Dark ended with music, more or less related to the subject of the week. That week, the Evening Standard noted: "This intelligent (mostly), thought-provoking discussion was brought to an end by the song It's Illegal, It's Immoral, or It Makes You Fat."

"British Intelligence"

In a discussion titled "British Intelligence", broadcast on 16 July 1988, the guests included Merlyn Rees, H. Montgomery Hyde and a man called Robert Harbinson, described by Francis Wheen in The Independent newspaper as follows:

Bryans himself wrote:

The journalist Paul Foot described it as "one magnificent edition of After Dark in which Robin Ramsay excelled himself." During the discussion, another guest, retired GCHQ employee Jock Kane, claimed "that the new procedures recommended by the Security Commission regarding the removal of documents from GCHQ had not been implemented four years later."

The following week The Guardian newspaper reported:

"Save the Whale, Save the World?"

On 30 July 1988 "After Dark" turned its attention to the whale. One guest, Shigeko Misaki of the Institute of Cetacean Research, subsequently wrote:

Bianca Jagger and "Nicaragua"
John Underwood wrote of the programme broadcast on 6 August 1988: "I recall hosting an edition of... After Dark in which (Bianca Jagger) intellectually crushed Dr John Silber, a senior adviser to Ronald Reagan, and Roberto Ferrey, an apologist for the Contras. Furthermore, she left Sir Alfred Sherman lost for words, a feat rarely achieved before or since."

Jonathan Miller and "Alternative Medicine"

In the New Statesman the writer Sean French described "the best moment of my week" occurring at the end of the 3 September 1988 edition:

Gerry Adams
The following week Channel 4 dropped plans to invite the Sinn Féin president Gerry Adams "to appear on its late night talk show After Dark, after protests from other contributors. The Independent Broadcasting Authority said then that it would have banned Mr Adams on the grounds that his views were offensive to public feeling. Channel 4 avoided a dispute with the IBA by dropping the programme, saying it had only wanted Mr Adams to appear if a suitable context could be found and that, at such short notice, it had been impossible to achieve that."

The Guardian wrote:

The Daily Telegraph wrote:

Channel 4's former Chief Executive, Jeremy Isaacs, speaking at a public lecture that month, said he would have given the After Dark air-time to Adams: "Although I sympathise with what must have been a difficult decision, broadcasters are always going to be accused of self-censorship. Yasser Arafat was allowed on Channel 4 because he happened to represent a lot of people but I knew this would lead to criticism because he is one of many who believe it is right to use any means of obtaining power". The row was later placed in context by the academic study The Media and Northern Ireland:

An alternative view is provided by Laura K. Donohue (writing in the Cardozo Law Review ), who summarises Professor Keith Ewing and Conor Gearty as follows:

Following a debate in the House of Commons Liz Forgan of Channel 4 challenged this account in a letter to The Times:

The producer later commented in an article in Lobster magazine:

Series Three

Tony Benn and "Out of Bounds"
The first programme of the third series was titled Out of Bounds: "1988 was the year of the tri-centenary of the Bill of Rights, yet in May 1989, in the shadowy studio of Channel 4's After Dark programme, a group of former British and US intelligence agents discussed the merits and evils of new legislation on official secrets. When this legislation completes its processes through Parliament such a gathering is likely to become illegal."

The Financial Times wrote:

Tony Benn wrote in his diary, later published as The End of an Era:

Asked during the course of the programme if the secret service should be democratically accountable Lord Dacre replied:

The Listener magazine described the programme:

Richard Norton-Taylor reported on guests who did not appear because of concerns about contempt of court: "Michael Randle and Pat Pottle, who admitted helping the spy, George Blake, escape from prison in 1966... have been dropped from the... programme... Mr Randle and Mr Pottle were arrested and released on police bail last week after admitting in a book that they had helped Blake escape." Michael Randle eventually appeared on After Dark, fourteen years later, on 22 March 2003.

Hillsborough and "Football – The Final Whistle?"

On 20 May 1989, following the Hillsborough disaster and on the night after the FA Cup Final, After Dark invited bereaved parents to participate, one of whom said:

A lengthy extract from what bereaved mother Eileen Delaney said can be read here.

'Blue' and "Drugs"
A week later The Times wrote:

Denis Healey and "Back in the USSR?"

The programme the following week was described by ITN as being "about the changes in Soviet Russia. Former communist (and later British Chancellor) Denis Healey; novelist Tatania Tolstoya and other Russians including journalist Vitali Vitaliev and dissident Vladimir Bukovsky." The Communist journal Unity later wrote "The last time I saw Bukovsky was on a Channel 4 programme After Dark in which he slaughtered the drinks trolley and got up the nose of the former Labour leader [sic] Denis Healey who seemed to work out pretty early that this bloke was not the best of people."

Edward Heath

On 10 June 1989 "in the course of a bad-tempered late-night television discussion programme during the European election campaign in June, (former Prime Minister) Edward Heath contemptuously rejected the possibility, posed by the former American Defence Secretary Richard Perle, that the political map of Europe was about to be transformed: 'Does anyone seriously believe that these satellite countries are going to become free democracies and does anyone really believe that Moscow is going to see the disintegration of the Soviet empire?

This was the first time a former Prime Minister had appeared on After Dark. Edward Heath was a guest again, on 2 March 1991, discussing the Persian Gulf with Lord Weidenfeld and Adnan Khashoggi.

"Pride and Prejudice"
On 24 June 1989, in the run up to the 20th anniversary of the Stonewall riots in New York, After Dark asked what progress in terms of gay rights had been made since the 1960s. Guests included the playwright Martin Sherman and the psychiatrist Dr Ismond Rosen. The Wellcome Collection describes the programme in their catalogue:

"Germany – 50 Years On"
In his book A Thread of Gold the Rabbi Albert Friedlander describes his participation in the After Dark discussion held on the 50th anniversary of the start of the Second World War:

"Body Beautiful"
Later in September 1989, the Evening Standard said "After Dark 'provided us with the best talk, entertainment and drama of the weekend, when a group sat down to discuss the Body Beautiful. On one seat sat Mandy Mudd, representing the London Fat Woman's Group.... Strategically seated next to her on the sofa was the exquisite Suzanne Younger, Miss United Kingdom.... The most impressive guests were Molly Parkin, who asked all the right questions; ex-body builder Zoe Warwick, whose perceptiveness and incisive comments kept opening up new areas of discussion; and Professor Arthur Marwick, who had to bear the brunt of everyone's criticism and abuse.... Ms Mudd and disabled actor Nabil Shaban shouted him down." A columnist in The Times, Barbara Amiel, wrote "A very fat lady and a deformed man (told) a beauty queen that her looks were 'boring'. Any suggestion that she was beautiful, they explained, was simply a reflex of a conditioned and oppressed culture. My outrage at this nonsense was tempered by the inability of the beauty queen to do much more than squeak."

"Death Penalty?"
A week later, on 7 October 1989, "a hangman (Syd Dernley) declared, in the presence of a judge yearning for the return of the death penalty (Michael Argyle), that if authorised he would happily kill another guest, a former IRA man (Sean O'Dochartaigh)".

"The Royal Family"

On 21 October Tony Wilson hosted a discussion about royalty with, among others, Andrew Morton, Peregrine Worsthorne and Archduke Karl von Habsburg. The Irish Independent wrote that Worsthorne "likened meeting the Queen Mother to meeting Einstein".

Xaviera Hollander and "Men and Women: What's the Difference?"

On 28 October 1989, during a discussion on differences between men and women with among others Mary Stott and Hans Eysenck, one guest, Malcolm Bennett, "successfully propositioned the Happy Hooker author Xaviera Hollander, and the pair walked off the live set to continue their discourse privately."

Edwina Currie and "What Makes MPs Run?"
A week later, on "the night of 4th November 1989 the politician Edwina Currie appeared, truly live and unconstrained, on After Dark, while at exactly the same time the BBC transmitted her appearance on another programme (Saturday Matters) recorded earlier but as usual announced as "live". After Dark had fun with Currie's apparent bilocation and the clash of realities". The Newcastle Journal reported that "An angry lady called her 'a conceited witch' and hoped she would never set eyes on her again".

Series Four

"Arms and the Gulf"
The British Film Institute characterised the opening discussion of the new series in January 1991 as follows:

"Survival – At What Cost?"
The programme the following week was described by ITN as "As the 1991 Gulf War begins, a group of survivors discuss their feelings – with a powerful appearance by Auschwitz survivor Rabbi Hugo Gryn and Sheila Cassidy, tortured by Chileans while General Pinochet was in power" Gryn's daughter wrote: "At first Hugo and another guest, Karma Nabulsi, a representative of the PLO, seemed hostile to one another, but before long they were giggling like old friends".

Oliver Reed and Kate Millett: "Do Men Have To Be Violent?"

At the height of the Gulf War, Oliver Reed appeared on an edition discussing militarism, masculine stereotypes and violence to women: "Both the topic and Reed's invitation were timely...the British Army were deploying women to the frontline for the very first time; also, that same week, Oliver Reed had won a libel case against The Sun, which had called him a wife beater". As The Daily Telegraph wrote in 2021, "Reed's contributions to After Dark – and to British television history, thanks to much repeated clips – were indeed valuable: inappropriate comedy gold. Belligerent, disruptive, sloshed on half pints of wine...(Reed) freestyled about the dynamic between men and women". After one hour Reed returned from the toilet and, getting more to drink, rolled on top of the noted feminist author Kate Millett, who then complained (though she later asked for a tape of the show to entertain her friends). A member of the production team later wrote that Reed "got famously sloshed but perhaps not quite as much as viewers may have thought (or as other guests had been – the drinking record was held by philosopher A. J. Ayer)". Another guest on the programme, author Neil Lyndon, wrote an article in The Independent about the experience.

The show received much attention and, as reported later in The Daily Telegraph, "has become mythologised, largely because of the events around it. In a first for British TV, the show was pulled off the air during its live broadcast. Not because of Oliver Reed's antics...but because of a hoax call - a mistake that Channel 4 tried to swiftly brush under the wine-splashed carpet". The producer wrote later to the British television trade magazine Broadcast:

In his column in the Daily Mirror, Victor Lewis-Smith boasted of his hoax call: "The show was taken off air not by C4, but by... little-old-wine-drinking-me, sitting at home, far from the TV studio.... Once connected, I shouted: 'Michael Grade is furious about this. Take the bloody programme off... now!

The lawyer Geoffrey Robertson wrote: "The Broadcasting Standards Council condemned the makers of After Dark for not blacking out Oliver Reed's crude and boorish behaviour...when this behaviour was actually proving the point in a discussion of 'men and violence.

Channel 4's Deputy Programme Director, John Willis, wrote an internal memo: "Oliver Reed got drunk and a hoaxer caused the programme briefly to be taken off air. I view the latter with a great deal more seriousness than the former... 1,000 calls from an audience estimated at just 300,000. Remarkable."

Gordon Winter and Peter Hain

A week later the programme discussed "The Cost of a Free Press" with, among others, Duncan Campbell, Anthony Howard and Lord Lambton. In the course of the programme, Gordon Winter said "I was a chief witness against Peter Hain, and then BOSS ordered me to do a maverick witness to get him off in order to beat up Jeremy Thorpe. Peter Hain – of course he was set up by the South Africans – of course he was." Peter Hain had himself appeared on the very first After Dark programme several years earlier (see here).

Prisons: No Way Out
On 29 February 1991, a discussion about prison reform featured a "rare live appearance by socialite writer Taki Theodoracopolous, who (admitted) he deserved his prison sentence for cocaine possession. Another striking guest (was) Tony Lambrianou, who served 15 years for his part in the murder of Jack The Hat McVitie."

The Sunday Times wrote "Taki was reluctant to appear...nervous about what consorting with criminals would do to his image. Funny really, when the only person he hit it off with on the show was the long-term criminal Tony Lambrianou".

The Gulf

The discussion on 2 March 1991 featured the only live TV appearance by Adnan Khashoggi, together with a confrontation between Lord Weidenfeld and David Mellor's friend Mona Bauwens (daughter of a senior PLO figure). Also on the programme Chris Cowley, implicated in the Iraqi supergun affair and former Conservative Prime Minister Edward Heath."

Andy Croall and "Satanic Ritual Abuse"
Britain's first alleged case of 'satanic' abuse was handled by staff at Nottinghamshire county council, and led to a debate on After Dark. Deputy director of social services Andy Croall was suspended by Nottinghamshire county council as a result of his appearance on the programme. The discussion on 9 March 1991 – "After Rochdale" – was later described by two academics:

Croall "agreeing with Campbell about the existence of satanic abuse" had said during the programme that "as a Christian I believe it's God time for it [satanic abuse] to be revealed….. it's a time when, in God's plan, it's going to be revealed." The Daily Telegraph reported what happened next: "More than 100 Christians gathered outside County Hall to demonstrate their support for Mr Andrew Croall ... . Members of the National and Local Government Officers Association, meanwhile, held a protest backing the suspension. His supporters rallied before a meeting of the county social services committee. Mr Croall's remarks ... had outraged members of NALGO, who called for his resignation."

James Harries and "Teachers"

The New Statesman described the programme broadcast on 23 March 1991:

The Yorkshire Ripper
Today described the programme broadcast on 6 April 1991:

The Daily Star added:

Mr Sutcliffe also said his son was "a lovely lad" a description with which Michael Winner very much disagreed. The ICA wrote: "it ended with (Stefan Jaworzyn) vehemently debating the meaning of the word "integrity" with fellow guest Michael Winner".

Channel 4 axing
In August 1991, Channel 4 announced the end of the series, an action which became the subject of an editorial in The Times.

The Independent newspaper noted: "Grade's programming is confused: he axed the talk show... allegedly to make way for even more innovative programmes, yet replaced it with a series of Seventies repeats. He praised After Dark lavishly in public but, in a letter to Edward Heath, said it 'promised more than it delivered'." The producer wrote later in an article in Lobster magazine:

An open letter was published, signed by Professor Sir Ian Kennedy, Buzz Aldrin, Billy Bragg, Beatrix Campbell, Lord Dacre, Gerald Kaufman, Mary Midgley, Richard Perle, Merlyn Rees, Richard Shepherd, Ralph Steadman, Peter Ustinov, Lord Weidenfeld and many others:

Angela Lambert wrote later in The Independent:

The producers wrote warning that After Dark "loss poses such a threat to broadcasting freedom. It is...the only television programme whose guests were not straitjacketed into a fixed time-slot, subjected to precensorship or editing, or confronted with a celebrity host and a noisy studio audience. That year and on through the 1990s we argued, loudly, that After Dark should be put back on air, it being an effective and necessary corrective to the limitations and excessive controls created by the mass broadcasting of those days."

Later programmes

Specials
From 1993 Channel 4 broadcast a number of After Dark one-off specials. In 1995 the Financial Times wrote:

In 1997 a Channel 4 executive was said by The Guardian to be "insistent that 'it's a popular misconception that we killed it off. In fact we never lost it. We haven't done another series, but we did a one-off After Dark recently in our abortion season'. Bizarrely, Channel 4 cited After Dark as a model of the kind of cerebral programme it wanted when inviting (independent production company) submissions in May.... 'I can't think of any ideas that would make better late-night programming than After Dark,' he said, echoing the words of the original commissioning executive of After Dark, Seamus Cassidy, who in an interview to the Irish News in 2005 said, "I'm probably most proud of After Dark."

"Bloody Bosnia"

In 1993 The Independent magazine wrote of the first After Dark special, broadcast as part of the Channel 4 season Bloody Bosnia:

During the programme viewers saw "Koljević admit Serb concentration camps in Bosnia". Also present was Sir Fitzroy Maclean, who was the British liaison to Josip Broz Tito's Partisans in World War II.

Sinéad O'Connor and "Ireland: Sex & Celibacy"
In January 1995 "Sinéad O'Connor was so interested in a discussion about [sexual] abuse and the Catholic church that she rang in to ask if she could appear. They sent a taxi to her home." The Evening Standard wrote that "After Dark made a brief reappearance last Saturday night when, true to its unpredictable form, Sinéad O'Connor walked on to the set 10 minutes before closedown." Host Helena Kennedy described the event:

"Lethal Justice"
The Glasgow Herald wrote of the After Dark special broadcast on 17 August 1995:

"After Diana"
This special was broadcast on 13 September 1997, a fortnight after Diana, Princess of Wales, died from the injuries she sustained in a car crash. With a rare appearance by Claus von Bülow, guests also included George Monbiot, Emmanuel Le Roy Ladurie and Beatrix Campbell, who "argued that Princess Diana had survived victimhood to realise her true self-identity".

BBC series

In January 2003, The Guardian wrote:

Tom O'Carroll and "Child Protection: How Far Should We Go?"
In March 2003 After Dark gave airtime to a self-confessed paedophile. The Guardian described the show:

Silke Maier-Witt and "Terrorism: Who Wins?"
A week later, a discussion about terrorism saw "the one-time Baader-Meinhof terrorist Silke Maier-Witt confess she could no longer remember why she had done what she did".

"Iraq: Truth and Lies?"
The last After Dark ("Iraq: Truth and Lies?") was transmitted on 29 March 2003. The producer wrote: "The very last After Dark programme ended, appropriately enough perhaps, with a plug for the campaign for a screen-free TV Turnoff Week".

Other notable programmes
As listed on the webpage of ITN Source:

1988
 On 11 March fashion designer Bruce Oldfield arrived well after the programme began, having decided to finish his meal in a West End restaurant before joining the other guests.
 On 30 April – during a discussion between a witch, a psychiatrist, an exorcist and an alleged victim of Satanic abuse  – After Dark became possibly the first UK TV programme to air claims that newborn babies were ritually consumed.
 On 27 August one of the Oz trial defendants was reintroduced to the judge who sentenced him.

1989
 On 16 September, possibly the first discussion about paedophilia on British television featured a perpetrator, a victim and a psychiatrist who recommended castration.
 On 18 November, Whitley Strieber, who said he was abducted by space aliens, met astronaut Buzz Aldrin.
 On 25 November, a man who proposed to take up the offer by the then government of South Africa to emigrate to their country very cheaply, was introduced to South Africans who told him what to expect, including newspaper editor Donald Woods and the musician Abdullah Ibrahim, who closed the programme with an extended jazz impro on piano.

1997
 On 13 September After Dark featured an appearance by Claus von Bülow.

Other
Some other After Dark programmes were highlighted in an article in the Radio Times in 2003:

 "One show ("Counting The Cost of a Free Press", 2 February 1991) was plunged into darkness by a power cut. The guests carried on talking during the blackout."
 "Mary Whitehouse was told by a female pensioner: 'What women want is a Mars bar and a bottle of gin.
 "The guest who consumed the most alcohol was philosopher A. J. Ayer. 'He had been through the best part of a bottle of Scotch, but he was still brilliant.

And, from a comment in The Guardian in 2012:

 "Off the top of my head I remember...a group of witches...and a heart-breaking discussion on euthanasia with a lot of people about to die. There has never been anything else like it."

Channel 4 anniversaries
In October 2007, as part of its 25-year anniversary celebrations, Channel 4 repeated the first ever After Dark on the More4 channel, billing it as "Anthony Wilson hosts a discussion concerning secrets – both secrets of the State and the personal secrets we keep from one another." In 2012, on the occasion of the 30th anniversary of Channel 4, After Dark featured prominently in a number of two-page tributes in British newspapers.

BFI InView
In 2009 the British Film Institute announced that After Dark programmes were available online through its InView service. This web-based learning resource was free but accessible only to UK Higher Education/Further Education institutions, in partnership with The National Archives, the Parliamentary Broadcasting Unit, the BBC, FremantleMedia and the After Dark production company Open Media. The BFI said InView offered examples of how some of the UK's key social, political and economic issues have been represented and debated. Until the service came to an end in 2020 fifty editions of what the BUFVC called 'the much missed series After Dark' were streamed online.

Production

Editorial
The producer wrote: "We made programmes about familiar British issues (or 'diseases', as we called them): the treatment of children, of the mentally ill, of prisoners, and about class, cash and racial and sexual difference. Several programmes were concerned with matters of exceptional sensitivity to the then Thatcher government, such as state secrecy or the Troubles in Northern Ireland. Places further afield but just as important – Chile, Eritrea, Iran, Iraq, Israel, Nicaragua, South Africa and Russia – featured regularly, as did programmes explicitly about the pressures history puts on the present (After Dark noted anniversaries as various as the Second World War and the death of Freud). Less apparently solemn subjects – sport, fashion, gambling, pop music – were in the mix from the start and turned out to be more serious than viewers might have expected."

The main themes of After Dark were listed in an internal memo in 1988:

 Lovelessness: the spaces in our society that for whatever reason are cold, empty, formulaic, unfeeling, systematised and filled only with empty rhetoric or silence.
 Who owns your body? Do you? Does the State? Your doctor? Your lover? The police? Your parents? This theme covers a variety of apparently unrelated subjects: imprisonment, health care, capital punishment, mental illness, abortion, schooling...
 What happens "after dark"? Sex, crime, astronomy...
 Shining light into the shadows we find not only Ralf Dahrendorf's underclass but also the invisible people. Some invisible people are so because they choose to be (criminals, spies, the hidden rich) but others are invisible because we do not want to see them (the homeless, the dispossessed, the mentally confused, the dying...). Among the invisible there is a new slave class: some of those were uncovered by Gunther Wallraff in his documentary "The Lowest of the Low" (illegal immigrants who are used for clearing up nuclear accidents although the work is known to be fatal).
 Do you want to know a secret? Guests tell all, or their bit of it.
 What is beyond the law? Who is beyond the law?
 Not knowing is an act of choice. During a discussion on the Holocaust, an Austrian woman claimed "We did not know"; another participant countered by saying that not all knowing comes from reading newspapers. Looking, listening and drawing deductions are another way of knowing, so choosing not to look or listen or draw a deduction can be conscious "not knowing". So: what things in our society are we choosing to look away from, choosing not to know? What will our grandchildren accuse us of?"

Guest selection 

"After Dark is different: experts sit side by side with ordinary people – irrespective of age, race, gender or sexual orientation – whose experience happens to relate to the subject.... (The producer says) 'An average show should consist of Punch, Judy, a crocodile, a hangman and a grandmother'." 'There's nobody I wouldn't have on the programme'.

Mark Lawson wrote in The Independent:

The Times wrote: "Some of the juxtapositions have been inspired." "After the Nelson Mandela concert last summer it ran a discussion programme including Harry Belafonte, Breyten Breytenbach, Denis Worrall and Ismail Ayob, Mandela's lawyer. Belafonte came directly from Wembley with a police escort for his only British TV appearance. Programme hired a private plane to fly in Breytenbach. Worrall came from South Africa at After Dark expense. But this largesse is apparently unusual."

The producer wrote: "In amongst the exceptional and the celebrated, the stars and the scandalous, quieter folk often triumphed. Those who had written to us with a story to tell or who had been discovered through diligent research found that the format allowed them a voice, despite strong competition. Though maybe as late as an hour or more into the programme, they could nonetheless re-shape the discussion and might well trump the polished assertions of more professional experts."

Working method

The Times wrote:

and the TV trade magazine Televisual commented:

The programme was "the most uncensorable programme in the history of British television. Genuinely live – unlike many so-called "live" shows which are delayed by seconds or longer – and crucially open-ended, the participants in these unique broadcast discussions were able to take control of the content: the programme concluded only when everyone had said everything they wanted to say."

The producer described the working method:

Presenter Tony Wilson said "After Dark kept its participants apart before the transmission" Presenter John Underwood reckons the first give-away is guests' choice of seats when they enter the studio: "Power figures, people used to being listened to, plump themselves down opposite the host. The seat on the presenters' right, a bit in the shadows, is chosen by dark horses whose contributions are few but deadly." He also relishes the unexpected alliances that are formed and the genuine dialogue that becomes possible.

Jay Rayner described the backstage atmosphere in Arena magazine:

City Limits wrote:

Q magazine quoted the producer: "We're actually trying to break down the barriers that divide people...Jeremy Isaacs told us it was the best proposal for a live show he'd ever seen." "I really don't know what's going to happen." The Listener magazine said 'After Dark has taken the format towards the realm of psychodrama, peeling away its participants layers of restraint and front.

Hosts

The production team sought hosts who were "more than the usual mechanical hack audience appeal" and "a facilitator rather than a celebrity figure". Senior director Coutts intended their role to be minimal, saying that "They interrupt if everyone is shouting at each other and generally just keep things going." He added that getting the hosts to "shut up" was the most difficult thing. "Tony Wilson, a familiar face to programme watchers in Granadaland, understands that he will not be the host next week. Indeed he knows he will not be asked again if he attempts to direct the discussion."

At a broadcasting conference in 1992 Tony Wilson said:

In 2021 journalist Fergal Kinney wrote of Tony Wilson’s work as a host of the programme:

Other frequent presenters of the series included Prof. Anthony Clare, Helena Kennedy QC, Prof. Sir Ian Kennedy, Sheena McDonald, Matthew Parris and John Underwood. Those who hosted only one edition include Anthony Holden, Stuart Hood, Henry Kelly and John Plender.

Staffing
The Guardian ran the first recruitment advertisement for programme staff:

The producer wrote:

A gameshow producer got his break into television by writing to After Dark: "They eventually put me on a very short contract cutting articles out of the papers. It was the most junior job I'd ever had and I was extremely happy! Over the next two series of After Dark, I read and cut 10 newspapers a day, 10 magazines a week, plus monthly digests of foreign press – a fantastic introduction to current affairs. I enjoyed the intellectual cut-and-thrust of the office, the thrill of live broadcasting, and the diversity of the subjects we covered."

A senior member of staff described her working week:

Direction

In 2021 The Daily Telegraph wrote: "Don Coutts directed it like a drama. "Because it was a drama every week...And it wasn't always about the person speaking. There was a lot of looking at other people"." About the look of the show Coutts said "We used big close-ups, pulled focus or used a panning system. The camera work was radical...The idea was to use very low light conditions, and an atmosphere that was supposed to be dark and moody". Coutts is still pleased with the way viewers could turn the television on and within seconds know that what they were watching couldn't be anything other than After Dark."

The producer wrote: "Guests sat in a circle and so concentrated on each other rather than the cameras. For the benefit of the watching audience at home, the participants were often filmed listening, a sight far more expressive than the faces we make when speaking. In fact After Dark gave such opportunities for listening that on occasion viewers even saw guests – slowly, perhaps only provisionally but nonetheless – changing their minds on air.".

Legal
A Channel 4 lawyer wrote:

Cultural references
 After Dark featured in Biff cartoons from The Guardian in 1988.
 After Dark was parodied on a regular basis as part of the BBC1 comedy series Alas Smith and Jones.
 The comic writer William Donaldson ran a column in The Independent newspaper about attempts made by After Dark staff to contact him (they "didn't know me from a hole in the road and merely wanted Janie Jones's number").
 Simon Bell plays the part of an After Dark presenter in the 1989 film The Tall Guy.
 In 2011 Oliver Reed's appearance on After Dark featured in the BBC radio play Burning Both Ends by Matthew Broughton
 In 2016 After Dark was the inspiration for the touring production The Destroyed Room by theatre company Vanishing Point.

See also
 List of After Dark editions
 Open Media

References

External sources

 Production company's list of all guests, hosts, programme titles and dates
 Credits (from IMDb)
 One entire episode and several clips of others (from the production company's YouTube channel)
 Interview with Helena Kennedy launching a new series of After Dark (The Sunday Times, 23 February 2003)

 
Channel 4 original programming
British political television series
Television censorship in the United Kingdom
1980s British television series
1990s British television series
1987 British television series debuts
2003 British television series endings
British television talk shows
British television series revived after cancellation
Debate television series